Jojoba alcohol is the alcohol fraction obtained by the saponification of jojoba oil from the seeds of Simmondsia chinensis. Jojoba alcohol is commonly used in cosmetic formulations.

Chemical constituents 
Jojoba alcohol is a mixture of both saturated and unsaturated long chain alcohols of between 16 and 26 carbons in chain length, including:

C16:0	Hexadecanol
C17:1	cis-8-Heptadecenol
C18:0	Octadecanol
C18:1	cis-9-Octadecenol
C18:1	cis-11-Octadecenol
C20:0	Eicosanol
C20:1	cis-11-Eicosenol
C21:1	cis-12-Heneicosenol
C22:0	Docosanol
C22:1	cis-13-Docosenol
C24:1	cis-15-Tetracosenol
C26:0	Hexacosanol

Physical properties 
Jojoba alcohol is a clear, colorless liquid at room temperature.

See also 
 Jojoba ester
 Jojoba wax esters

References

Cosmetics chemicals
Fatty alcohols